The Lady Vanishes is a 1979 British comedy mystery film directed by Anthony Page. Its screenplay by George Axelrod was based on the screenplay of 1938's The Lady Vanishes by Sidney Gilliat and Frank Launder, which in turn was based on the 1936 novel The Wheel Spins by Ethel Lina White. It stars Elliott Gould as Robert, Cybill Shepherd as Amanda (Iris), Angela Lansbury as Miss Froy, Herbert Lom, and Arthur Lowe and Ian Carmichael as Charters and Caldicott.

The film is a remake of Alfred Hitchcock's 1938 film of the same name. The film follows two Americans travelling by train across 1939 Germany. Together, they investigate the mysterious disappearance of an English nanny also travelling on the train. The setting of the remake is essentially similar to Hitchcock's film, but is openly set in pre-Second World War Germany rather than in the original fictional country. The Austrian fountain of Oberdrauburg by Hellmuth Marx is part of the setting. In addition, both leads have their nationality changed from British to American.

The film was the last one made by Hammer Films for 29 years, until the 2008 film Beyond the Rave.

Plot
In August 1939, a motley group of travellers find themselves in a small hotel in Bavaria, awaiting a delayed train to Switzerland. They include a "much-married madcap American heiress", Amanda Metcalf-Midvani-Von Hoffsteader-Kelly, and Robert Condon, a wise-cracking American photographer.

That evening Amanda gets very drunk and is knocked unconscious. The following morning, badly hungover, she finds herself in a train compartment with Miss Froy, an elderly governess, and Baroness Kisling with her servants. Other travellers include Charters and Caldicot, English gentlemen returning to Britain for the test match, and "Todhunter", an English diplomat "larking about" with his mistress, and Dr Egon Hartz.

When she wakes up, Miss Froy has vanished. Her fellow travellers, including a German baroness, deny seeing Miss Froy and declare that she never existed. Amanda begins to doubt her own mental condition. Amanda starts to investigate, joined only by a sceptical Condon. The train stops to pick up a badly burnt and heavily bandaged automobile accident victim. Shortly thereafter, a "Miss Froy" apparently re-appears, but it is not her.

The train resumes its journey and Amanda is attacked. Miss Froy's broken glasses are found and Condon now believes Amanda's story. They surmise that Miss Froy was lured to the baggage car and is being held captive – and that the heavily bandaged "accident victim" is in fact now Miss Froy. This proves to be the case and Dr Hartz instructs his wife, dressed as a nun (with high heels), to drug their drinks, but his wife chooses not to do so.

At the next station the train is diverted onto a branch line and only the buffet car and one carriage are left. The train stops and Helmut von Reider, an SS officer (son of Miss Froy's former employer), approaches the train, demanding that Miss Froy be surrendered. The passengers refuse and a gunfight ensues. Miss Froy chooses this moment to confess that she is in fact a courier with a vital coded message (she hums a tune to them) that must be delivered to a senior official in London. She leaves the train and disappears. Condon, Charters and Caldicot contrive to take over the engine and drive the train back to the main line and over the Swiss border.
Back in London at the Foreign Office, the duo attempt to remember the tune she sang, then suddenly they hear someone humming the same tune. It is Miss Froy who managed to escape her captors.

Cast
 Elliott Gould – Robert Condon
 Cybill Shepherd – Amanda Kelly
 Angela Lansbury – Miss Froy
 Herbert Lom – Dr Hartz
 Arthur Lowe – Charters
 Ian Carmichael – Caldicott
 Gerald Harper – Mr Todhunter
 Jenny Runacre – "Mrs" Todhunter
 Jean Anderson – Baroness
 Madlena Nedeva – Nun
 Madge Ryan – Rose Flood Porter
 Rosalind Knight – Evelyn Barnes
 Vladek Sheybal – Trainmaster
 Wolf Kahler – Helmut 
 Barbara Markham – Frau Kummer
 Peter Schratt – German Officer

Production
The producer formed a package and approached Tony Williams of Rank who agreed to finance. Williams had recently agreed to finance a remake of The 39 Steps; he defended the idea of remaking a classic:
The old films suffer technically against today's. The pace of modern films is much faster. The style of acting is different. Those old actors were marvellous, but if you consult the man in the street, he's more interested in seeing a current artist than someone who's been dead for years.
"What we're competing with here is not the real picture but people's memory of it", said George Axelrod. "Hitchcock's film had some brilliant things in it, but as a whole picture you'd have to admit it's pretty creaky. The four or five things people remember from the original receive a homage in our version – which raises the question of when a homage becomes a rip off."

Axelrod admitted the script was "not like the stuff I normally do, which is two people in and around a bed" but he agreed to do the adaptation because "this picture is actually going to be shown in theatres for actual people to see". Axelrod's involvement resulted from ABC TV wanting him to write a version of Murder on the Orient Express (1974) – he suggested they buy the rights to Night Train or The Lady Vanishes. He ended up writing three different versions of The Lady Vanishes for ABC, but none was picked up. The rights then reverted to Rank Films, who asked Axelrod to work on the film.

Among Axelrod's changes to the original were setting the new film in 1939 Germany, and altering the hero to a photographer from Life Magazine and the heroine to be a screwball "rompy, Carole Lombard character." The script was constantly rewritten as filming went along.

George Segal and Ali MacGraw were originally announced for the leads.

Reception
The consensus of critics is that the film suffers by comparison to Hitchcock's 1938 film. On Rotten Tomatoes, it has an approval rating of 33% based on six reviews, with an average rating of 3.2/10. 

Geoff Andrew of Time Out notes that "Comparisons are odious, but this remake of Hitchcock's thriller continually begs them by trampling heavily over its predecessor". The Encyclopedia of British Film, in the entry about director Anthony Page, says it is "about as witless and charmless as could be conceived".

Variety magazine notes that the script is "best when dwelling on English eccentricity to make the film's most endearing impression...Shepherd and Gould stack up as contrived cliches, characters that jar rather than complement." Film4's review agrees, writing that the two leads are "ruthlessly upstaged by loveable old coves Arthur Lowe and Ian Carmichael as cricket-mad Charters and Caldicott". It calls it a "watchable remake".

References

External links 
 
 

1979 films
1970s comedy mystery films
1970s spy comedy films
British comedy mystery films
British spy comedy films
Films set in 1939
Films set in Germany
Films set on trains
Hammer Film Productions films
Films shot at Pinewood Studios
Remakes of British films
Films based on British novels
Films based on mystery novels
Films directed by Anthony Page
Films with screenplays by George Axelrod
1979 comedy films
1970s English-language films
1970s British films